Chugunov (from чугун meaning cast iron) is a Russian masculine surname, its feminine counterpart is Chugunova. It may refer to
Dmitri Chugunov (born 1968), Russian football player
Galina Chugunova (born 1980), Russian sprint canoer

Russian-language surnames